Wright v. United States  was the name of several US Supreme Court cases.
The most significant was the case of 1938 (302 U.S. 583), which partly overruled the court's earlier decision in the Pocket Veto Case.

External links 
 https://supreme.justia.com/cases/federal/us/302/583/

United States Supreme Court cases
United States Supreme Court cases of the Hughes Court
Veto